Anderseniella  is a genus of bacteria from the family of Rhodobiaceae. Up to now there is only one species of this genus known (Anderseniella baltica).

References

Further reading 
 
 
 

Hyphomicrobiales
Monotypic bacteria genera
Bacteria genera